With 41 accredited teacher education programs, Illinois State University is one of the premier teaching preparation institutions in the nation. The College of Education offers a range of undergraduate and graduate teacher education and administrator preparation programs and certificates.

Accreditations
Illinois State University has been continuously accredited since 1954.

In April 2012, The Board of Examiners found that Illinois State successfully met all six of the national standards for educator preparation.  In addition, Illinois State achieved the highest marks (“target”) in four standards.  The NCATE report cited the following areas of strength:
  Content preparation of educators
  Clinical experience opportunities for candidates
  Multiple initiatives to incorporate diversity across the unit
  Broad participation of faculty members in the unit governance system

School of Teaching and Learning

Undergraduate programs
 Early Childhood Education
 Elementary Education
 Elementary Education: Bilingual/Bicultural Sequence
 Middle Level Education

Graduate programs
 Master's Degree in Reading
 Master's Degree in Teaching and Learning
 Doctoral in Teaching and Learning

Department of Special Education

Undergraduate programs
 Special Education: Specialist in Deaf and Hard Hearing Sequence
 Special Education: Specialist in Learning and Behavior Sequence
 Special Education: Specialist in Low Vision and Blindness Sequence

Graduate programs
 Master's Degree in Special Education (Master of Science or Master of Science in Education)
 Doctoral in Special Education
 Graduate Certificate Programs 
 Deaf and Hard of Hearing Listening and Spoken Language Profession
 Director of Special Education
 Learning and Behavior Specialist II: Behavior Intervention Specialist
 Learning and Behavior Specialist II: Curriculum Adaptation Specialist
 Learning and Behavior Specialist II: Multiple Disabilities Specialist
 Learning and Behavior Specialist II: Transition Specialist

Department of Educational Administration and Foundations

Social foundations
Social Foundations are undergraduate courses taken in EAF.

Graduate programs
 Master's Degree in College Student Personnel Administration
 Master's Degree in P-12 Educational Administration (Principal Preparation)
 Doctoral in Higher Education Administration
 Doctoral in P-12 Administration
 Graduate Certificates/Endorsements
 Chief School Business Official Endorsement
 Superintendent Endorsement

References 

Illinois State University
Schools of education in Illinois